Jackson Airport may refer to:

Jackson Municipal Airport, Alabama in Jackson, Alabama, United States
Jackson Municipal Airport, Minnesota in Jackson, Minnesota, United States
Jackson County Airport (disambiguation)
Jackson Hole Airport, Wyoming, USA
Jacksons International Airport, Papua New Guinea
Jackson-Evers International Airport, Mississippi, USA
Hartsfield-Jackson Atlanta International Airport, Georgia, USA
Jackson McKellar-Sipes Regional Airport, Jackson, Tennessee, USA